The following highways are numbered 293:

Brazil
 BR-293

Canada
 Quebec Route 293

Israel
Route 293 (Israel)

Japan
 Japan National Route 293

United States
  Interstate 293
  Alabama State Route 293
  Florida State Road 293
  Georgia State Route 293
  Georgia State Route 293 Connector
  Kentucky Route 293
  Minnesota State Highway 293 (former)
  Montana Secondary Highway 293 (former)
  Nevada State Route 293
  New Mexico State Road 293
  New York State Route 293
 New York State Route 293 (former)
  North Carolina Highway 293
  Ohio State Route 293
  Oregon Route 293
  Pennsylvania Route 293 (former)
  Tennessee State Route 293
 Texas:
  Texas State Highway 293 (former)
  Texas State Highway Loop 293
  Farm to Market Road 293
  Utah State Route 293
  Virginia State Route 293